The 2019 Wolffkran Open was a professional tennis tournament played on carpet courts. It was the third edition of the tournament which was part of the 2019 ATP Challenger Tour. It took place in Ismaning, Germany between 14 and 20 October 2019.

Singles main draw entrants

Seeds

 1 Rankings are as of 7 October 2019.

Other entrants
The following players received wildcards into the singles main draw:
  Daniel Altmaier
  Matthias Bachinger
  Filippo Baldi
  Jonáš Forejtek
  Louis Wessels

The following player received entry into the singles main draw using a protected ranking:
  Maximilian Neuchrist

The following player received entry into the singles main draw as an alternate:
  Illya Marchenko

The following players received entry from the qualifying draw:
  Julian Lenz
  Mats Rosenkranz

The following player received entry as a lucky loser:
  Vitaliy Sachko

Champions

Singles

 Lukáš Lacko def.  Maxime Cressy 6–3, 6–0.

Doubles

 Quentin Halys /  Tristan Lamasine def.  James Cerretani /  Maxime Cressy 6–3, 7–5.

References

External links
 Official website

Wolffkran Open
2019
October 2019 sports events in Germany
Wolf